The Buffoon lemniscomys or Buffoon striped grass mouse (Lemniscomys macculus) is a species of rodent in the family Muridae.
It is found in the Democratic Republic of the Congo, Ethiopia, Kenya, South Sudan, Uganda, and possibly Rwanda.
Its natural habitats are moist savannah and subtropical or tropical seasonally wet or flooded lowland grassland.

References

 Van der Straeten, E., Lavrenchenko, L. & Rahman, E.A. 2004.  Lemniscomys macculus.   2006 IUCN Red List of Threatened Species.   Downloaded on 19 July 2007.

Lemniscomys
Rodents of Africa
Mammals described in 1910
Taxa named by Oldfield Thomas
Taxonomy articles created by Polbot